Smbat Gariginovich Lputian (sometimes transliterated as Lputyan; ; born 14 February 1958, in Yerevan) is an Armenian chess Grandmaster. He was first at tournament in Berlin 1982, shared first at Athens 1983 and at Irkutsk 1983, first at Sarajevo 1985 and at Irkutsk 1986, shared first at Hastings 1986–87 and first at Dortmund 1988.  He won the Armenian Championship in 1978, 1980, 1998, and 2001. In 2006, he won a team gold medal (together with Levon Aronian, Vladimir Akopian, Karen Asrian, Gabriel Sargissian and Artashes Minasian) at the 37th Chess Olympiad.
Smbat Lputyan has been the founder-president of Chess Academy of Armenia since 2002.

Lputian earned the International Master (IM) title in 1982 and the Grandmaster (GM) title in 1984.

In December 2009, he was awarded the title of "Honoured Master of Sport of the Republic of Armenia".

On the July 2009 FIDE list his Elo rating is 2574. His handle on the Internet Chess Club is "SM".

References

External links

 
 
 Smbat Lputian at Grandmaster Games Database (redhotpawn.com)
 
 

1958 births
Living people
Armenian chess players
Chess grandmasters
Chess Olympiad competitors
Sportspeople from Yerevan